Gunsight Mountain is a prominent  elevation summit located  northeast of Palmer in the Talkeetna Mountains of the U.S. state of Alaska. This landmark is set midway between Palmer and Glennallen, with the Glenn Highway traversing the southern base of this mountain. The mountain's descriptive local name was reported in 1952 by U.S. Geological Survey, and derives from a conspicuous deep notch in the summit ridge which has the appearance of a gunsight. This mountain is called Siz'aani, meaning "Heart", in the Ahtna language.

Climate

Based on the Köppen climate classification, Gunsight Mountain is located in a subarctic climate zone with long, cold, snowy winters, and mild summers. Winter temperatures can drop below −20 °C with wind chill factors below −30 °C. The months May through June offer the most favorable weather for climbing or viewing. Precipitation runoff from the mountain drains into tributaries of the Matanuska River.

See also

Matanuska Formation
Geography of Alaska

References

External links
 Weather forecast: Gunsight Mountain
 Climbing information: Alaska.org
 Climbing blog with photos

Mountains of Alaska
Landforms of Matanuska-Susitna Borough, Alaska
Mountains of Matanuska-Susitna Borough, Alaska
North American 1000 m summits